Ichneumenoptera xanthogyna is a moth of the family Sesiidae. It is known only from locations near Kuranda in Queensland, Australia.

The length of the forewings is about 11 mm for males and about 15 mm for females.

External links
Australian Faunal Directory
Classification of the Superfamily Sesioidea (Lepidoptera: Ditrysia) 
New records and a revised checklist of the Australian clearwing moths (Lepidoptera: Sesiidae)

Moths of Australia
Sesiidae
Moths described in 1919